Musa Viktorovna Krepkogorskaya (July 9, 1924, Moscow — June 26, 1999, Moscow) was a Soviet and Russian theater and film actress, Honored Artist of the RSFSR (1989). 

Wife of actor Georgi Yumatov. They met at VGIK during the 1940s and lived together up till Yumatov's death. Krepkogorskaya was never as popular as her husband, even though he made sure that she was given at least minor roles in every movie he appeared in.

Muza Krepkogorskaya died on June 26, 1999. She was buried in Moscow at the Vagankovo Cemetery.

Selected filmography
 It Happened in the Donbass (1945)
 The Train Goes East (1947)
 The Young Guard (1948)
 Glorious Path (1949)
 Happy Flight (1949)
 Bountiful Summer (1951)
 The Unforgettable Year 1919 (1951)
 Incident in the Taiga (1953)
 World Champion (1954)
 The Anna Cross (1954)
 Lyana (1955)
 Different Fortunes (1956)
 White Acacia (1957)
 Close to Us (1958)
 The First Trolleybus (1963)
 Tale About the Lost Time (1964)
 Don't Forget... Lugovaya Station (1966)
 Fire, Water, and Brass Pipes (1968)
 Officers (1971)
 Earthly Love (1974)
 It Can't Be! (1975)
 Practical Joke (1977)
 Destiny (1977)
 Moscow Does Not Believe in Tears (1980)
 Particularly Important Task (1980)
 Sailors Have No Questions (1980)
 At the Beginning of Glorious Days (1980)
 They Were Actors (1981)
 Married Bachelor (1982)
 Dangerous for Your Life! (1985)
 Trips on an Old Car (1985)
 To Award (Posthumously) (1986)
 Private Detective, or Operation Cooperation (1990)
 Anna Karamazoff (1991)
 Weather Is Good on Deribasovskaya, It Rains Again on Brighton Beach (1992)

References

External links
 
 

1924 births
1999 deaths
Gerasimov Institute of Cinematography alumni
Soviet actresses
Honored Artists of the RSFSR
Burials at Vagankovo Cemetery
Actresses from Moscow